Nebraska Highway 25 is a highway in southwestern Nebraska. Its southern terminus is at the Kansas border south of Trenton. Its northern terminus is at U.S. Highway 30 in Sutherland.

A previous routing of the highway is now Nebraska Highway 25A, which serves as a spur to Palisade.

Route description
Nebraska Highway 25 begins at the Kansas border and serves as a continuation of K-25. It goes north into farmland and near the Swanson Reservoir before it turns northeast to go into Trenton. In Trenton, NE 25 meets U.S. Highway 34. It proceeds north through Hayes Center, then goes northwesterly to the border of Hayes County and Lincoln County. The highway then turns due north and meets Nebraska Highway 23 near Wallace. It continues north, meets Interstate 80 shortly before entering Sutherland, and ends in Sutherland at an intersection with U.S. Highway 30.

Major intersections

Highway 25A

Nebraska Highway 25A has a southern terminus in Palisade at U.S. Highway 6 and a northern terminus at Highway 25 northeast of Palisade. The highway functions as a spur route into Palisade from NE 25. The highway also previously served as an alignment of NE 25 prior to 1961.

References

External links

The Nebraska Highways Page: Highways 1 to 30
Nebraska Roads: NE 21-40

025
Transportation in Hitchcock County, Nebraska
Transportation in Hayes County, Nebraska
Transportation in Lincoln County, Nebraska